Fyodor Pavlovich Karamazov is a fictional character from the 1880 novel The Brothers Karamazov by Fyodor Dostoevsky. He is the father of Alexei, Ivan, and Dmitri Karamazov, and rumoured also to be the father of his house servant Pavel Fyodorovich Smerdyakov. His conflict with the eldest son—Dimitri—comprises a major part of the book's overt plot, although it becomes clear as events unfold that Ivan's relation to him is equally significant. Each of the sons represents a distinct character, life orientation and filial attitude that allows Dostoevsky to examine the theme of the father-son relationship in all its complexity and moral ambiguity. Fyodor Pavlovich is a self-indulgent and shameless libertine, apparently not concerned in any way with the normal responsibilities of fatherhood or the welfare of his children. Moral questions, particularly those arising from notions of filial obligation, are thus tested in great depth, and the consideration of their relation to the wider reality of Russian social disintegration is always in the background.  

At the trial following his murder, the prosecutor Ippolit Kirillovich describes Fyodor Pavlovich as follows:

References

The Brothers Karamazov
Fyodor Dostoyevsky characters
Fictional rapists
Fictional Russian people in literature
Literary characters introduced in 1880
Male characters in literature